Marklo was, according to the Vita Lebuini antiqua, an important source for early Saxon history, the tribal capital of the Saxons in which they held an annual council to "confirm their laws, give judgment on outstanding cases, and determine by common counsel whether they would go to war or be in peace that year." After the conquest of old Saxony by Charlemagne in 782 the tribal councils of Marklo were abolished.

Marklo has been identified by the anthropologist Henry Hoyle Howorth with the village of Markenah in the district of Hoya near Heiligen Ioh, a "sacred wood" and Adelshorn in Lower Saxony.

In 1931 the town of Lohe, changed their name to Marklohe. The speculation was that Lohe had been called Marklo by the pre-Christian Saxons with the name being abbreviated over the centuries. That idea could not be certified.

References

 Goldberg, Eric J. "Popular Revolt, Dynastic Politics, and Aristocratic Factionalism in the Early Middle Ages: The Saxon Stellinga Reconsidered." Speculum, Vol. 70, No. 3. (July 1995), pp 467–501.
 Howarth, H. H., "The Ethnology of Germany: Part IV, The Saxons of Nether Saxony, Section II" The Journal of the Anthropological Institute of Great Britain and Ireland, 1880.

Old Saxony